An indirect presidential election (officially the 16th Federal Convention) was held on 12 February 2017 to elect the 12th President of Germany. Incumbent President Joachim Gauck announced on 6 June 2016 that he would not stand for re-election, citing his advancing age.

The President is elected by the Federal Convention, an electoral body that consists of all members of the current Bundestag and an equal number of electors, who are elected by the sixteen state parliaments. Frank-Walter Steinmeier of the Social Democratic Party was chosen as the single candidate of the ruling coalition in November 2016; with the Christian Democratic Union choosing not to field a candidate against him, his election was seen as guaranteed. Steinmeier was elected on the first ballot, and took office on 19 March 2017.

Composition of the Federal Convention
The Bundesversammlung was composed as follows:

 
In the Federal Convention, a candidate needs a majority (at least 631 votes) to become President. If no candidate gets a majority of votes in the first two ballots, a plurality is sufficient on the third ballot.

Candidates
Every member of the Federal Convention (members of the Bundestag and state electors, once they are elected by their respective state parliament) can propose candidates for the presidency. It is required that the President be a German citizen and at least 40 years old. Every candidate has to declare their consent to running. Candidates can be proposed before the Federal Convention and (theoretically) during the Convention before every ballot. If the President-elect is a member of a legislature or a government on federal or state level, he has to resign from that office before the start of their term. A sitting President is not allowed to run for a third consecutive term.

Chancellor Angela Merkel originally wanted to nominate Green politician Marianne Birthler, who succeeded Gauck as the Federal Commissioner for the Stasi Records from 2001 to 2011, and as the CDU/CSU and the Greens control a majority in the Federal Convention, Birthler's election would have been secured. However, Birthler after some time decided not to run.

On 14 November 2016 the governing parties CDU/CSU and the Social Democratic Party named the Minister of Foreign Affairs and former Vice Chancellor of Germany Frank-Walter Steinmeier as their consensus candidate. Alliance 90/The Greens and the Free Democratic Party endorsed Steinmeier. The other parties were considered likely to either endorse Steinmeier or name candidates of their own to express discontent with the consensus candidate. In any case Steinmeier was the clear favorite to win the election, because the parties endorsing his candidacy held more than 1000 votes in the Federal Convention.

Alternative for Germany proposed the former treasurer of Frankfurt Albrecht Glaser, and the Free Voters named the judge and TV celebrity Alexander Hold. Both were widely considered to have no real chance of winning the presidency, because their respective parties had few electors in the Federal Convention and it was unlikely that they would receive endorsements from other parties. On 20 November 2016 The Left nominated the political scientist Christoph Butterwegge. Martin Sonneborn, member of the satirical party Die PARTEI and state elector (North Rhine-Westphalia) for the Pirate Party proposed his father, the retired career consultant Engelbert Sonneborn.

Except for Sonneborn, all candidates were electors in the Federal Convention themselves. Steinmeier was a member of the current Bundestag, Butterwegge and Glaser were elected as state electors for Saxony and Hold as state elector for Bavaria.

Results
The 16th Federal Convention elected Frank-Walter Steinmeier on the first ballot. He entered office on 19 March 2017.

References

2017
2017 elections in Germany
February 2017 events in Germany
Frank-Walter Steinmeier